State Route 53 (SR 53), also known as the Clearlake Expressway for part of its length, is a state highway in the U.S. state of California that runs in a north–south direction in Lake County east of Clear Lake, It connects SR 29 and SR 20 via the city of Clearlake.

Route description

SR 53 begins at California State Route 29 in the town of Lower Lake, near Anderson Marsh State Historic Park, primarily as a four-lane divided semi-rural expressway. The highway then heads northward along Clear Lake, the largest freshwater lake located entirely in California. It bypasses the center of Clearlake, California, instead going through the neighborhood of the "Avenues". Once it crosses Lakeshore Drive, it narrows down to a two-lane highway until its northern terminus at California State Route 20 north of the city limits.

State Route 53 is part of the California Freeway and Expressway System, and is part of the National Highway System, a network of highways that are considered essential to the country's economy, defense, and mobility by the Federal Highway Administration. SR 53 is eligible for the State Scenic Highway System, but it is not officially designated as a scenic highway by the California Department of Transportation.

Major intersections

See also

References

External links

California @ AARoads.com - State Route 53
Caltrans: Route 53 highway conditions
California Highways: SR 53

053
State Route 053
Clearlake, California
Lower Lake, California